The R160 road is a regional road in Ireland, located in County Meath and County Kildare.

References

Regional roads in the Republic of Ireland
Roads in County Meath
Roads in County Kildare